Psorobia ovis, the sheep itch mite, is a species of mite in the family Psorergatidae. It can cause mange in sheep.

References

Trombidiformes
Parasitic acari
Parasitic arthropods of mammals